M. K.  Raghavan (born 1952) is an Indian Politician. He is a Member of 17th Lok Sabha and Secretary, Congress Parliamentary Party.

He represents the Kozhikode Lok Sabha constituency of Kerala. He belongs to Indian National Congress. He was the General Secretary of the Kerala Pradesh Congress Committee. He was born to Krishnan Nambiar and Janaki Amma on 21 April 1952 at Payyannur, Kerala.

Fielded as a strong candidate by the UDF in the LDF bastion of Kozhikode in the 2009 Lok Sabha election, M. K. Raghavan managed to wrangle victory riding on the general anti-CPI(M) wave in the state as well as the conscience votes of the CPI(M) partner Janata Dal (S) which was denied its sitting seat. However, it was noted that he won by a meagre 838 votes while three dummy candidates for his opponent P. A. Muhammad Riyas of CPI(M) bagged more votes than this winning margin. However, he cemented his victory with much better margins in the subsequent Lok Sabha elections in 2014 with 16,883 and 2019 with 85,225.

He has selected as Chairman, Divisional Railway Monitoring Committee of Palakkad Division.

References

External links
 Lok Sabha Member Profile: M. K.  Raghavan

1952 births
Living people
India MPs 2009–2014
Indian National Congress politicians from Kerala
Lok Sabha members from Kerala
India MPs 2014–2019
Politicians from Kozhikode
India MPs 2019–present